Ciolkowo may refer to the following places in Poland:
Ciołkowo, Greater Poland Voivodeship
Ciółkowo, Masovian Voivodeship